Kepler-36b is an exoplanet orbiting the star Kepler-36. This planet has the closest conjunction to Kepler-36c every 97 days. Its density is similar to that of iron.

During their closest approach, Kepler-36b and Kepler-36c are located only 0.013 AU (about 1,900,000 km) from each other, which causes extreme transit-timing variations for both planets. Transit-timing variations caused by Kepler-36c are strong enough to put narrow constraints on Kepler-36b's mass. The close proximity of the planet to its host star combined with its relatively low mass caused the planet to lose all or most of its primordial hydrogen/helium envelope.

References

Cygnus (constellation)
36b
Exoplanets discovered in 2012